La Visita Que No Tocó El Timbre ("The Visit That Did Not Ring The Bell") is a 1954 Mexican film written by Luis Alcoriza. Two brothers who live together take responsibility for an abandoned baby. Mario Camus directed a remake of the movie in 1965.

External links
 

1954 films
1950s Spanish-language films
1954 romantic comedy films
1954 romantic drama films
1954 comedy-drama films
1950s romantic comedy-drama films
Mexican romantic comedy-drama films
Mexican black-and-white films
Films directed by Julián Soler
1950s Mexican films